"Jabdah" is a song recorded by Italian synthpop group Koto. Released in 1986, it was their first single that charted. It was written by Anfrando Maiola and Stefano Cundari and produced by Stefano Cundari and Alessandro Zanni. The song reached No. 11 in Switzerland, No. 23 in Germany and No. 28 in the Netherlands. Like Koto's previous single "Visitors", it is considered part of the "spacesynth" canon. It is their most remixed song, with twelve official remixes.

Chart positions

Use in Optus Advertisement 
Part of "Jabdah" was used in a video ad for major Australian telecom company Optus in 2019. The advertisement was directed by Steve Rogers, and aired across Australian Free-to-Air TV and YouTube.

References 

1986 singles
Koto (band) songs
1986 songs